The New Armenia Public Salvation Front is an opposition party to the Republican Party of Armenia, led by Lebanese-born Armenian Jirair Sefilian.

In June 2016, Sefilyan and six of his supporters were arrested and accused of preparing to seize government buildings and telecoms facilities in the capital, Yerevan.

References

Political parties in Armenia
Political parties with year of establishment missing